KQW may refer to:

KCBS (AM), a radio station on 740 kHz licensed to San Francisco, California, United States, and originally licensed to San Jose, California, and which held the call sign KQW from 1921 to 1949.  Perhaps the best history of KQW and KCBS available today is "The History of KQW and KCBS San Jose/San Francisco" By John F. Schneider (http://www.sfradiomuseum.com/schneider/kqw.shtml)
 
KQWB (AM), a radio station on 1660 kHz licensed to West Fargo, North Dakota, United States
KQWB-FM, a radio station on 98.7 MHz licensed to Moorhead, Minnesota, United States
KQWC-FM, a radio station on 95.7 MHz licensed to Webster City, Iowa
KQWS, an FM radio station on 90.1 MHz licensed to Omak, Washington, United States
KQWY, an FM radio station on 96.3 MHz licensed to Lusk, Wyoming, United States
WLOQ, an FM radio station on 96.3 MHz licensed to Oil City, Pennsylvania, which held the call sign WKQW-FM from 1992 to 2022